Mohammad Hafeez is a Pakistani International cricketer.

Mohammad Hafeez may also refer to:

 Mohammad Hafeez (cricketer, born 1974), Pakistani first-class cricketer played for Multan
 Muhammad Hafeez (cyclist), former Pakistani cyclist
 Muhammad Hafeez Qureshi, Pakistani nuclear scientist